Ian Hobson is an English pianist, conductor and teacher, and is a professor at University of Illinois at Urbana–Champaign and at Florida State University.  His pianistic repertoire spans the baroque to the contemporary, but he specialises in the Romantic repertoire. Starting September 1st 2023 he will be serving as a guest conductor of Sinfonia Varsovia.

Biography
Hobson was born in Wolverhampton.  He studied at King Henry VIII School, Coventry, the Royal Academy of Music, Magdalene College, Cambridge, and Yale University in the United States.  His teachers included Claude Frank, Ralph Kirkpatrick and Menahem Pressler.

Hobson made his London debut in 1979. He won silver medals in the Arthur Rubinstein and Vienna-Beethoven competitions and first prize in the 1981 Leeds International Pianoforte Competition. His United States debut came in 1983, and he has since performed in concert and recital in many countries and with many orchestras. He frequently conducts from the keyboard.

His piano repertoire includes:
 J.S. Bach: Goldberg Variations
Mozart: Piano Concertos
 Beethoven: Piano Sonatas
 Mendelssohn: works for piano and orchestra
 Robert Schumann: Piano Sonatas
 Clara Schumann: Piano Concerto
 Moscheles: Piano Concertos
 Liszt: 2-piano arrangements of music by Saint-Saëns
 Brahms: Variations
 Rachmaninoff: 17 Études-Tableaux, comprising Études-Tableaux, Op. 33 and Études-Tableaux, Op. 39, 24 Preludes, and transcriptions
 Paderewski: Piano Concerto
 Godowsky: Studies on Chopin's Études, and transcriptions of Schubert lieder
 David Johnson: 12 Preludes and Fugues
 concertos by Huss and Schelling
 contemporary works by Benjamin Lees, Kevin Oldham, Ridout, Liptak and Gardner, some of which were written for him.

He has appeared in duo recital with his then wife Claude Edrei Hobson.

He has attracted world class instrumental soloists to appear with the Sinfonia da Camera, which he founded in 1984.  His opera conducting activities include works from Giovanni Battista Pergolesi to Richard Strauss.  For his own Zephyr label, he conducted the world premiere of a new concert edition of John Philip Sousa's operetta El Capitan, with the Sinfonia da Camera, and also recorded the work. His other recordings include Stravinsky's Histoire du soldat and Walton's Façade, with the baritone William Warfield.

Prior to joining the faculty at Florida State University, Hobson served as a music professor at the faculty of the University of Illinois at Urbana–Champaign.  He has been a juror on a number of international music competitions. Hobson is the father of NPR Here & Now host Jeremy Hobson.

References

External links
 Bach Cantatas: Ian Hobson
 Ian Hobson website

Year of birth missing (living people)
Living people
English classical pianists
Male classical pianists
English conductors (music)
British male conductors (music)
British music educators
Piano pedagogues
Florida State University faculty
Alumni of Magdalene College, Cambridge
Alumni of the Royal Academy of Music
Yale School of Music alumni
Classical piano duos
Pupils of Maria Curcio
21st-century British conductors (music)
21st-century classical pianists
21st-century British male musicians